A reduced-gravity aircraft is a type of fixed-wing aircraft that provides brief near-weightless environments for training astronauts, conducting research and making gravity-free movie shots.

Versions of such airplanes were operated by the NASA Reduced Gravity Research Program, and one is currently operated by the Human Spaceflight and Robotic Exploration Programmes of the European Space Agency. The unofficial nickname "vomit comet" became popular among those who experienced their operation.

History 

Parabolic flight as a way of simulating weightlessness was first proposed by the German aerospace engineer Fritz Haber and the German physicist Heinz Haber in 1950. Both had been brought to the US after World War II as part of Operation Paperclip. As well, Shih-Chun Wang studied nausea in astronauts for NASA, which helped lead to the creation of the vomit comet.

Parabolic flights are sometimes used to examine the effects of weightlessness on a living organism. While humans are by far the most common passengers, non-human animals have occasionally been involved in experiments, including a notable experiment on how weightlessness affected a domestic cat's righting reflex and a pigeon's attempts to navigate in a weightless state.

Operating principles 
The aircraft gives its occupants the sensation of weightlessness by following a parabolic flight path relative to the center of the Earth. While following this path, the aircraft and its payload are in free fall at certain points of its flight path.  The aircraft is used in this way to demonstrate to astronauts what it is like to orbit the Earth. During this time the aircraft does not exert any ground reaction force on its contents, causing the sensation of weightlessness.

Initially, the aircraft climbs with a pitch angle of 45 degrees using engine thrust and elevator controls. The sensation of weightlessness is achieved by reducing thrust and lowering the nose to maintain a neutral, or "zero lift", configuration such that the aircraft follows a ballistic trajectory, with engine thrust exactly compensating for drag. Weightlessness begins while ascending and lasts all the way "up-and-over the hump", until the craft reaches a downward pitch angle of around 30 degrees. At this point, the craft is pointing downward at high speed and must begin to pull back into the nose-up attitude to repeat the maneuver. The forces are then roughly twice that of gravity on the way down, at the bottom, and up again. This lasts all the way until the aircraft is again halfway up its upward trajectory, and the pilot again reduces the thrust and lowers the nose.

This aircraft is used to train astronauts in zero-g maneuvers, giving them about 25 seconds of weightlessness out of 65 seconds of flight in each parabola. During such training, the airplane typically flies about 40–60 parabolic maneuvers. In about two thirds of the passengers, these flights produce nausea due to airsickness, giving the plane its nickname "vomit comet".

Operators

Canada
The Canadian Space Agency and the National Research Council have a Falcon 20 used for microgravity research. The small plane is normally not used for people to float freely and experience weightlessness; however, comedian Rick Mercer did so for a segment of his show.

Ecuador

The first zero G plane to enter service in Latin America is a T-39 Sabreliner nicknamed CONDOR, operated for the Ecuadorian Civilian Space Agency and the Ecuadorian Air Force since May 2008. On June 19, 2008, this plane carried a seven-year-old boy, setting the Guinness world record for the youngest person to fly in microgravity.

Europe
In 2014 the A300 was phased out in favor of a more modern Airbus A310, also named Zero-G. It is based at Bordeaux-Mérignac airport in France, operated by Novespace, and has also been flown from Paris Le Bourget airport and Dübendorf Air Base in Switzerland. Since 1997 CNES subsidiary Novespace has handled the management of these flights.

This  aircraft is used also to realize commercial flights for public passengers in partnership between operator Novespace and the Avico company, under Air Zero G brand. The aircraft has also been used for cinema purposes, with Tom Cruise and Annabelle Wallis filming for The Mummy in 2017.

Russia
In Russia, commercial flights are offered on the Ilyushin Il-76 jet; several U.S. companies book flights on these jets.

United States

NASA

NASA flew zero gravity flights on various aircraft for many years. In 1959 Project Mercury astronauts trained in a C-131 Samaritan aircraft dubbed the "vomit comet".

Twin KC-135 Stratotankers were used until December 2004 and later retired. One, a KC-135A registered N930NA (also known as NASA 930, formerly USAF serial no. 59-1481), flew more than 58,000 parabolas after NASA acquired it in 1973, before being retired in 1995. It is now on display at Ellington Field, near the Johnson Space Center. The other (N931NA or NASA 931, formerly AF serial no. 63-7998) was also used by Universal Pictures and Imagine Entertainment for filming scenes involving weightlessness in the movie Apollo 13; it made its final flight on October 29, 2004, and is permanently stored in the Pima Air & Space Museum in Tucson, Arizona.

In 2005 NASA replaced the aircraft with a McDonnell Douglas C-9B Skytrain II (N932NA)  formerly owned by KLM Royal Dutch Airlines and the United States Navy.

NASA concluded the Reduced Gravity Research Program and ended operations in July 2014, due to aircraft technical problems. It is replaced with private company contracts.

 NASA had a microgravity services contract with Zero Gravity Corporation (ZERO-G) and used its aircraft, G-FORCE ONE, a modified Boeing 727-200.

Other operators
In late 2004, the Zero Gravity Corporation became the first company in the United States to offer zero-g flights to the general public, using Boeing 727 jets. Each flight consists of around 15 parabolas, including simulations of the gravity levels of the Moon and Mars, as well as complete weightlessness. This profile allows ZERO-G's clients to enjoy weightlessness with minimal motion discomfort.

In 2015, Integrated Spaceflight Services, began serving as the research and education integrator of the National Research Council of Canada for the US market, offering comprehensive reduced-gravity services on a modified Falcon 20 aircraft. ISS has flown annual microgravity research campaigns to evaluate space suits and other technologies with Project PoSSUM.

Aurora Aerospace in Oldsmar, Florida offers zero-g flights using a Fuji/Rockwell Commander 700. It is also used to simulate the gravity of the Moon and Mars.

Airsickness
According to former Reduced Gravity Research Program director John Yaniec, anxiety contributes most to passengers' airsickness. The stress on their bodies creates a sense of panic and therefore causes the passenger to vomit. Yaniec gives a rough estimate of passengers, that "one third [become] violently ill, the next third moderately ill, and the final third not at all." Vomiting is referred to as "ill".

Scopolamine is often used as an antiemetic during reduced-gravity-aircraft training.

Use in media production 
1995 film Apollo 13 (film) filmed many scenes aboard NASA's KC-135 parabolic aircraft.

In 2016, rock group OK Go recorded a music video for their single Upside Down & Inside Out on a reduced-gravity aircraft, which involved acrobatic choreography created specifically for the zero-gravity environment.

The adult entertainment production company Private Media Group has filmed a pornographic movie called The Uranus Experiment: Part Two where a zero-gravity intercourse scene was filmed aboard a reduced-gravity aircraft. The filming process was particularly difficult from a technical and logistical standpoint. Budget constraints allowed for only one  shot, featuring the actors Sylvia Saint and Nick Lang. Berth Milton, Jr, president and CEO of Private Media Group, says "You would not want to be afraid of flying, that's for sure!"
 
The ZERO-G corporation was featured in the MythBusters NASA Moon Landing Conspiracy episode, and flew Adam Savage and Jamie Hyneman on a custom flight path to replicate the moon's gravity. This allowed Savage to replicate the footage of Neil Armstrong walking on the moon, disproving claims that the footage was forged.

See also
 Micro-g environment
 Space tourism
 Astronaut training
 Zero Gravity Research Facility
 Fallturm Bremen

References

Further reading
 Haber, Fritz and Haber, Heinz: "Possible Methods of Producing the Gravity-Free State for Medical Research", Journal of Aviation Medicine XXI (1950).
 Karmali, Faisal and Shelhamer, Mark. "The dynamics of parabolic flight: flight characteristics and passenger percepts". Acta Astronautica (2008).
 Easton, Pam (October 30, 2004). NASA's weightless aircraft is retired. Associated Press.
 Golightly, Glen (May 15, 2000). Vomit Comet finds a home. Space.com Houston Bureau.
 Overbye, Dennis (March 1, 2007), "Stephen Hawking plans prelude to the ride of his life", New York Times.

External links

 Reduced Gravity Research Program
 Flight Opportunities program
 Interview with John Yaniec 
 Incredible Adventures is a Florida company established in 1995, offering private zero-gravity flight training in Tampa, Florida
 About the NASA Reduced Gravity Research Program
 Vegitel ltd is a Russian company that offers zero-gravity flights in an IL-76 MDK wide-body aircraft
 Virtual tour of the Airbus A-300 Zero-G.
 C-135 Variants Part 6 – includes scale drawing of NASA 930
 Reduced Gravity Experiment in a Nasa's KC-135A

+
Space science
Weightlessness
Aircraft related to spaceflight